The Soviet of the Republic was one of the two chambers of the Supreme Soviet of the Russian SFSR (Russian Federation). In 1990-1993 it consisted of 126 deputies. The Soviet of the Republic was established in 1989, as one of the chambers of the formerly unicameral Supreme Soviet, and elected in 1990.

Soviet of the Republic was elected by the Congress of People's Deputies of the Russian Federation from among the deputies of the Russian Federation from territorial constituencies, taking into account the number of voters in the region.

On 21 September 1993 the Soviet of the Republic was dissolved by President of Russia, together with the Supreme Soviet and the Congress of People's Deputies during the armed siege of parliament.

Chairmen

References

External links
Russian Constitution of 1978 with amendments of 1989-1992

See also
Soviet of the Union

Government of Russia
Defunct lower houses
1990 establishments in Russia
1993 disestablishments
Russian Soviet Federative Socialist Republic
Supreme Soviet of Russia